Lukas Rhöse (born 7 August 2000) is a Swedish football midfielder who plays for Kalmar FF.

References

2000 births
Living people
Swedish footballers
Association football midfielders
Carlstad United BK players
Kalmar FF players
Ettan Fotboll players
Allsvenskan players